Lactic acid is an organic acid. It has a molecular formula . It is white in the solid state and it is miscible with water. When in the dissolved state, it forms a colorless solution. Production includes both artificial synthesis as well as natural sources. Lactic acid is an alpha-hydroxy acid (AHA) due to the presence of a hydroxyl group adjacent to the carboxyl group. It is used as a synthetic intermediate in many organic synthesis industries and in various biochemical industries. The conjugate base of lactic acid is called lactate (or the lactate anion). The name of the derived acyl group is lactoyl.

In solution, it can ionize by loss of a proton to produce the lactate ion . Compared to acetic acid, its pK is 1 unit less, meaning lactic acid is ten times more acidic than acetic acid. This higher acidity is the consequence of the intramolecular hydrogen bonding between the α-hydroxyl and the carboxylate group.

Lactic acid is chiral, consisting of two enantiomers. One is known as -lactic acid, (S)-lactic acid, or (+)-lactic acid, and the other, its mirror image, is -lactic acid, (R)-lactic acid, or (−)-lactic acid. A mixture of the two in equal amounts is called -lactic acid, or racemic lactic acid. Lactic acid produced by fermentation of milk is often racemic, although certain species of bacteria produce solely -lactic acid. On the other hand, lactic acid produced by anaerobic respiration in animal muscles has the  enantiomer and is sometimes called "sarcolactic" acid, from the Greek , meaning "flesh".

In animals, -lactate is constantly produced from pyruvate via the enzyme lactate dehydrogenase (LDH) in a process of fermentation during normal metabolism and exercise. It does not increase in concentration until the rate of lactate production exceeds the rate of lactate removal, which is governed by a number of factors, including monocarboxylate transporters, concentration and isoform of LDH, and oxidative capacity of tissues. The concentration of blood lactate is usually  at rest, but can rise to over 20mM during intense exertion and as high as 25mM afterward. In addition to other biological roles, -lactic acid is the primary endogenous agonist of hydroxycarboxylic acid receptor 1 (HCA), which is a  G protein-coupled receptor (GPCR).

In industry, lactic acid fermentation is performed by lactic acid bacteria, which convert simple carbohydrates such as glucose, sucrose, or galactose to lactic acid. These bacteria can also grow in the mouth; the acid they produce is responsible for the tooth decay known as caries. In medicine, lactate is one of the main components of lactated Ringer's solution and Hartmann's solution. These intravenous fluids consist of sodium and potassium cations along with lactate and chloride anions in solution with distilled water, generally in concentrations isotonic with human blood. It is most commonly used for fluid resuscitation after blood loss due to trauma, surgery, or burns.

History
Swedish chemist Carl Wilhelm Scheele was the first person to isolate lactic acid in 1780 from sour milk. The name reflects the lact- combining form derived from the Latin word , meaning "milk". In 1808, Jöns Jacob Berzelius discovered that lactic acid (actually -lactate) also is produced in muscles during exertion. Its structure was established by Johannes Wislicenus in 1873.

In 1856, the role of Lactobacillus in the synthesis of lactic acid was discovered by Louis Pasteur. This pathway was used commercially by the German pharmacy Boehringer Ingelheim in 1895.

In 2006, global production of lactic acid reached 275,000 tonnes with an average annual growth of 10%.

Production

Lactic acid is produced industrially by bacterial fermentation of carbohydrates, or by chemical synthesis from acetaldehyde. , lactic acid was produced predominantly (70–90%) by fermentation. Industrial scale production of -lactic acid by fermentation is possible, but much more challenging.

Fermentative production

Fermented milk products are obtained industrially by fermentation of milk or whey by Lactobacillus bacteria: Lactobacillus acidophilus, Lacticaseibacillus casei (Lactobacillus casei), Lactobacillus delbrueckii subsp. bulgaricus (Lactobacillus bulgaricus), Lactobacillus helveticus, Lactococcus lactis , Bacillus amyloliquefaciens, and Streptococcus salivarius subsp. thermophilus (Streptococcus thermophilus).

Pure sucrose, glucose from starch, raw sugar, and beet juice are frequently used. Lactic acid producing bacteria can be divided in two classes: homofermentative bacteria like Lactobacillus casei and Lactococcus lactis, producing two moles of lactate from one mole of glucose, and heterofermentative species producing one mole of lactate from one mole of glucose as well as carbon dioxide and acetic acid/ethanol.

Chemical production

Racemic lactic acid is synthesized industrially by reacting acetaldehyde with hydrogen cyanide and hydrolysing the resultant lactonitrile. When hydrolysis is performed by hydrochloric acid, ammonium chloride forms as a by-product; the Japanese company Musashino is one of the last big manufacturers of lactic acid by this route. Synthesis of both racemic and enantiopure lactic acids is also possible from other starting materials (vinyl acetate, glycerol, etc.) by application of catalytic procedures.

Biology

Molecular biology

-Lactic acid is the primary endogenous agonist of hydroxycarboxylic acid receptor 1 (HCA1), a  G protein-coupled receptor (GPCR).

Exercise and lactate

During power exercises such as sprinting, when the rate of demand for energy is high, glucose is broken down and oxidized to pyruvate, and lactate is then produced from the pyruvate faster than the body can process it, causing lactate concentrations to rise. The production of lactate is beneficial for NAD+ regeneration (pyruvate is reduced to lactate while NADH is oxidized to NAD+), which is used up in oxidation of glyceraldehyde 3-phosphate during production of pyruvate from glucose, and this ensures that energy production is maintained and exercise can continue. During intense exercise, the respiratory chain cannot keep up with the amount of hydrogen ions that join to form NADH, and cannot regenerate NAD+ quickly enough.

The resulting lactate can be used in two ways:
Oxidation back to pyruvate by well-oxygenated muscle cells, heart cells, and brain cells
Pyruvate is then directly used to fuel the Krebs cycle
Conversion to glucose via gluconeogenesis in the liver and release back into circulation; see Cori cycle
If blood glucose concentrations are high, the glucose can be used to build up the liver's glycogen stores.

However, lactate is continually formed at rest and during all exercise intensities. Lactate serves as a metabolic fuel being produced and oxidatively disposed in resting and exercising muscle. Some causes of this are metabolism in red blood cells that lack mitochondria, and limitations resulting from the enzyme activity that occurs in muscle fibers having high glycolytic capacity. Lactic acidosis is a physiological condition characterized by accumulation of lactate (especially -lactate), with formation of an excessively low pH in the tissues  a form of metabolic acidosis.

Lactic acidosis during exercise may occur due to the H+ from ATP hydrolysis (ATP4− + H2O → ADP3− +  + H+), and that reducing pyruvate to lactate (pyruvate− + NADH + H+ → lactate− + NAD+) actually consumes H+. The causative factors of the increase in [H+] result from the production of lactate− from a neutral molecule, increasing [H+] to maintain electroneutrality. A contrary view is that lactate− is produced from pyruvate−, which has the same charge. It is pyruvate− production from neutral glucose that generates H+:

Although the reaction glucose → 2 lactate− + 2 H+ releases two H+ when viewed on its own, the H+ are absorbed in the production of ATP. On the other hand, the absorbed acidity is released during subsequent hydrolysis of ATP: ATP4− + H2O → ADP3− +  + H+. So once the use of ATP is included, the overall reaction is
C6H12O6 → 2  + 2 H+

The generation of CO2 during respiration also causes an increase in [H+].

Neural tissue energy source 
Although glucose is usually assumed to be the main energy source for living tissues, there are a few reports that indicate that it is lactate, and not glucose, that is preferentially metabolized by neurons in the brain of several mammalian species (the notable ones being mice, rats, and humans). According to the lactate-shuttle hypothesis, glial cells are responsible for transforming glucose into lactate, and for providing lactate to the neurons. Because of this local metabolic activity of glial cells, the extracellular fluid immediately surrounding neurons strongly differs in composition from the blood or cerebrospinal fluid, being much richer with lactate, as was found in microdialysis studies.

Brain development metabolism 
Some evidence suggests that lactate is important at early stages of development for brain metabolism in prenatal and early postnatal subjects, with lactate at these stages having higher concentrations in body liquids, and being utilized by the brain preferentially over glucose. It was also hypothesized that lactate may exert a strong action over GABAergic networks in the developing brain, making them more inhibitory than it was previously assumed, acting either through better support of metabolites, or alterations in base intracellular pH levels, or both.

Studies of brain slices of mice show that β-hydroxybutyrate, lactate, and pyruvate act as oxidative energy substrates, causing an increase in the NAD(P)H oxidation phase, that glucose was insufficient as an energy carrier during intense synaptic activity and, finally, that lactate can be an efficient energy substrate capable of sustaining and enhancing brain aerobic energy metabolism in vitro. The study "provides novel data on biphasic NAD(P)H fluorescence transients, an important physiological response to neural activation that has been reproduced in many studies and that is believed to originate predominantly from activity-induced concentration changes to the cellular NADH pools."

Lactate can also serve as an important source of energy for other organs, including the heart and liver. During physical activity, up to 60% of the heart muscle's energy turnover rate derives from lactate oxidation.

Blood testing

Blood tests for lactate are performed to determine the status of the acid base homeostasis in the body. Blood sampling for this purpose is often arterial (even if it is more difficult than venipuncture), because lactate levels differ substantially between arterial and venous, and the arterial level is more representative for this purpose.

During childbirth, lactate levels in the fetus can be quantified by fetal scalp blood testing.

Polymer precursor

Two molecules of lactic acid can be dehydrated to the lactone lactide.  In the presence of catalysts lactide polymerize to either atactic or syndiotactic polylactide (PLA), which are biodegradable polyesters. PLA is an example of a plastic that is not derived from petrochemicals.

Pharmaceutical and cosmetic applications 
Lactic acid is also employed in pharmaceutical technology to produce water-soluble lactates from otherwise-insoluble active ingredients. It finds further use in topical preparations and cosmetics to adjust acidity and for its disinfectant and keratolytic properties.

Lactic acid containing bacteria have shown promise in reducing oxaluria with its descaling properties on calcium compounds.

Foods 
Lactic acid is found primarily in sour milk products, such as kumis, laban, yogurt, kefir, and some cottage cheeses. The casein in fermented milk is coagulated (curdled) by lactic acid. Lactic acid is also responsible for the sour flavor of sourdough bread.

In lists of nutritional information lactic acid might be included under the term "carbohydrate" (or "carbohydrate by difference") because this often includes everything other than water, protein, fat, ash, and ethanol. But in some cases lactic acid is ignored in the calculation.

Some beers (sour beer) purposely contain lactic acid, one such type being Belgian lambics. Most commonly, this is produced naturally by various strains of bacteria. These bacteria ferment sugars into acids, unlike the yeast that ferment sugar into ethanol. After cooling the wort, yeast and bacteria are allowed to “fall” into the open fermenters. Brewers of more common beer styles would ensure that no such bacteria are allowed to enter the fermenter. Other sour styles of beer include Berliner weisse, Flanders red and American wild ale.

In winemaking, a bacterial process, natural or controlled, is often used to convert the naturally present malic acid to lactic acid, to reduce the sharpness and for other flavor-related reasons. This malolactic fermentation is undertaken by lactic acid bacteria.

While not normally found in significant quantities in fruit, lactic acid is the primary organic acid in akebia fruit, making up 2.12% of the juice.

As a food additive it is approved for use in the EU, USA and Australia and New Zealand; it is listed by its INS number 270 or as E number E270. Lactic acid is used as a food preservative, curing agent, and flavoring agent. It is an ingredient in processed foods and is used as a decontaminant during meat processing. Lactic acid is produced commercially by fermentation of carbohydrates such as glucose, sucrose, or lactose, or by chemical synthesis. Carbohydrate sources include corn, beets, and cane sugar.

Forgery
Lactic acid has historically been used to assist with the erasure of inks from official papers to be modified during forgery.

Cleaning products

Lactic acid is used in some liquid cleaners as a descaling agent  for removing hard water deposits such as calcium carbonate, forming the lactate, calcium lactate. Owing to its high acidity, such deposits are eliminated very quickly, especially where boiling water is used, as in kettles. It also is gaining popularity in antibacterial dish detergents and hand soaps replacing Triclosan.

See also 
Category: Salts of lactic acid
:Category:Lactate esters
Acids in wine
Alanine cycle
Biodegradable plastic
Dental caries
MCT1, a lactate transporter
Thiolactic acid

References

External links 
 Corn Plastic to the Rescue 
 Lactic Acid: Information and Resources
 Lactic Acid Is Not Muscles' Foe, It's Fuel
 

Food acidity regulators
Alpha hydroxy acids
Exercise physiology
Preservatives
Propionic acids
E-number additives